The First Congregational Church of Clearwater (also known as Clearwater Gospel Tabernacle) is a historic church building in Clearwater, Minnesota, United States, built in 1861.  It was listed on the National Register in 1979 for having local significance in the themes of architecture and exploration/settlement.  It was nominated for its Greek Revival architecture, association with the area's New England settlers, and connection to the "Indian Scares" of 1862 and 1863.  After the Dakota War of 1862 and the murder of a Wright County family a year later,  area settlers feared further Native American attacks, prompting a third of the Euro-American population to move away permanently.  In Clearwater the remaining residents selected their largest and most defensibly sited building—the church—as a potential refuge.  It was outfitted with a stockade and a cache of provisions until the passage of several months proved the settlers' fears unwarranted.

See also
 List of Congregational churches
 National Register of Historic Places listings in Wright County, Minnesota

References

1861 establishments in Minnesota
Buildings and structures in Wright County, Minnesota
Churches completed in 1861
Congregational churches in Minnesota
Dakota War of 1862
Greek Revival church buildings in Minnesota
Churches on the National Register of Historic Places in Minnesota
Wooden churches in Minnesota
National Register of Historic Places in Wright County, Minnesota
Clearwater, Minnesota